Krzysztof Sobieraj (born 25 August 1981) is a Polish football manager and former player. He most recently managed KP Starogard Gdański.

Coaching career
Sobieraj started his coaching career at the age of 28. He terminated his contract with Arka Gdynia to become a player-manager at LZS Lubrzanka Kajetanów. Sobieraj signed a contract until the end of 2009. In 10 games in charge, the team recorded 2 victories and 1 draw. Sobieraj played in all matches, playing the full 90 minutes and scoring 1 goal. In 2010, he continued as a player, signing with Olimpia Elbląg.

In August 2019, Sobieraj joined Ogniwo Sopot, once again as a player-manager. Sobieraj was invited by his former teammate from Arka Gdynia, Tomasz Mazurkiewicz, who at the time worked for the club. On 4 April 2019 Sobieraj left his position to become assistant manager of Wisła Płock under his former manager from Arka Gdynia, Leszek Ojrzyński.

During 2018-2019, Sobieraj also worked as a youth coach at Gdyńska AP Dąbrowa and KP Frajda Gdynia.

On 11 October 2019, Sobieraj was appointed assistant manager of his former club Arka Gdynia under manager Aleksandar Rogić. Rogić was fired on 10 March 2020 and Sobieraj took charge of the team for the rest of the season.

Honours

Club
Arka Gdynia
 Polish Cup: 2016–17
 Polish Super Cup: 2017

References

Polish footballers
1981 births
Living people
Ekstraklasa players
II liga players
I liga players
Korona Kielce players
Błękitni Kielce players
KSZO Ostrowiec Świętokrzyski players
Olimpia Elbląg players
Warta Poznań players
Arka Gdynia players
Sportspeople from Kielce
Association football defenders
Polish football managers
Arka Gdynia managers